Anisoscelis hymenipherus is a species of leaf-footed bug in the family Coreidae. It occurs in South America. It was first described by English entomologist John O. Westwood in 1840.

References

Insects described in 1840
hymenipherus